Adria Mobil is a company based in Novo Mesto, Slovenia, that produces caravans and motorhomes, under the ADRIA brandname and sells 99 percent of the total turnover to the West European markets.

Rank
The company has a 6.5 percent market share on the European market and ranks sixth among the most successful European producers in the basic programme, caravans and motorhomes.

History
The company was established in 1965 as a part of Industrija motornih vozil (the basic organization of associated labour) and became autonomous in 1990.

In 1982, Adria launched its first motorhome, the Adriatik.

In 1996, Adria is transferred to the new company Adria Mobil.

In 1998, Adria launched the Coral low-profile motorhome range, then in 2010 the Sonic integral motorhome.

In 2007, Adria acquired the Spanish mobile home manufacturer Sun Roller.

In 2015, the manufacturer is celebrating its 50th anniversary by launching a specific collection of its Twin and Matrix models, recognizable by their metallic silver bodywork.

Adria was acquired by the French firm Trigano, one of the largest recreational vehicle companies in Europe, in 2017.

Adria Holidays
Adria Holidays is a subsidiary of Adria Mobil and offers complementary tourism services in spirit of Adria Mobil's product development for active spending of spare time.

Main offerings of Adria Holidays are:

 apartments on the Adriatic coast
 yacht charter services
 rentals of Adria Mobil's caravans

References

External links

 Adria Mobil official website
 Adria Holidays official website

Vehicle manufacturing companies established in 1965
Motor vehicle manufacturers of Slovenia
Recreational vehicle manufacturers
Slovenian brands
Caravan and travel trailer manufacturers